"Augenblick am Tag" is the fifth single from Christina Stürmer's fourth album, Lebe Lauter. Translated, the title means, "Day in the Blink of an Eye."

Charts and release history 
"Augenblick am Tag" was only released in Austria and reached number 29 on the charts.

2007 singles
Christina Stürmer songs
2006 songs
Polydor Records singles